Dwyer (pronounced DWAI–yur) is an unincorporated community located in Sunflower County, Mississippi, United States.

References

Unincorporated communities in Sunflower County, Mississippi
Unincorporated communities in Mississippi